is the railway station in Tabira-chō Ozaki-men, Hirado, Nagasaki Prefecture. It is operated by Matsuura Railway and is on the Nishi-Kyūshū Line.

Lines 
Matsuura Railway
Nishi-Kyūshū Line

Adjacent stations

Station layout
Higashi-Tabira Station has one ground level side platform.

Environs
National Route 204

History
1935-08-06 - Opens for business as Tabira Station.
1987-04-01 - Railways privatize and this station is inherited by JR Kyushu.
1988-04-01 - This station is inherited by Matsuura Railway.
1989-03-11 - This Station is renamed to present name.

External links
Matsuura Railway (Japanese)

Railway stations in Japan opened in 1935
Railway stations in Nagasaki Prefecture